Danielle Nicole Page (born November 14, 1986) is an American-Serbian women's basketball coach and former player. She also represented the Serbian national basketball team.

College statistics

Professional career
After going undrafted, Page signed with the WNBA's Connecticut Sun and played three games for the team in 2008. She has also played professionally in Bulgaria, Israel, Hungary, and France. In May 2018, she retired from professional basketball.

International career
In March 2015, Page received her Serbian citizenship in order to represent the Serbian national basketball team in the international competitions. She represented Serbian national basketball team at the EuroBasket 2015 in Budapest where they won the gold medal, and qualified for the 2016 Olympics, a first in the history of the Serbian team. The team won the bronze medal in Rio.

Post-career
After retiring from professional basketball, Page was hired as an assistant coach for the University of Toledo women's basketball program.

See also 
 List of Serbian WNBA players

References

External links
Danielle Page at eurobasket.com
Danielle Page at fiba.com
 Danielle Page at fibaeurope.com

1986 births
Living people
American emigrants to Serbia
American expatriate basketball people in Bulgaria
American expatriate basketball people in France
American expatriate basketball people in Hungary
American expatriate basketball people in Israel
American expatriate basketball people in Poland
American women's basketball coaches
American women's basketball players
Basketball players at the 2016 Summer Olympics
Connecticut Sun players
European champions for Serbia
Medalists at the 2016 Summer Olympics
Naturalized citizens of Serbia
Olympic basketball players of Serbia
Olympic bronze medalists for Serbia
Olympic medalists in basketball
Serbian expatriate basketball people in Bulgaria
Serbian expatriate basketball people in France
Serbian expatriate basketball people in Hungary
Serbian expatriate basketball people in Israel
Serbian expatriate basketball people in Poland
Serbian people of American descent
Serbian women's basketball players
Serbian women's basketball coaches
Small forwards
Basketball players from Colorado Springs, Colorado
Women's National Basketball Association players from Serbia
Undrafted Women's National Basketball Association players